Wingen  is a village in the Upper Hunter Shire, in the Hunter Region of New South Wales, Australia. Situated on the New England Highway, it lies about 15 minutes from the town of Scone. It is known for the local Burning Mountain tourist attraction, a burning underground coal seam. Wingen has a population of just several hundred people.

Its few businesses include an antique store and a pub.

The town is known for the  Burning Mountain, which according to scientists is the world's oldest known coal fire, and has been burning for approximately 6,000 years. Explorers in the 19th century mistook its smoking summit for a volcano. In fact the name Wingen comes from the local Aboriginal language, and means "fire".

The Wingen Maid is a rock formation in the local Wingen Maid Nature Reserve which resembles a woman when viewed from a particular direction.

A now-demolished railway station on the Main North railway line operated between 1871 and 1975.

Heritage listings
Wingen has a number of heritage-listed sites, including:
 Raglan Street: Mountain House, Wingen

References

External links 
 Sydney Morning Herald article on Wingen and the Burning Mountain
 Wingen Maid Nature Reserve

Suburbs of Upper Hunter Shire
Towns in the Hunter Region
Main North railway line, New South Wales